Maria Nikolajeva (born 16 May 1952) is a Swedish literary critic and academic, specialising in children's literature. Since 2008, she has been Professor of Education at the University of Cambridge and a Professorial Fellow of Homerton College, Cambridge. She has also been Director of Cambridge's Centre for Children's Literature since 2010. She previously taught at Stockholm University and Åbo Akademi University.

Selected works

References

1952 births
Living people
Literary critics of English
Swedish literary critics
Russian literary critics
Women literary critics
Russian women critics
Swedish women critics
Swedish women academics
Academic staff of Stockholm University
Academic staff of Åbo Akademi University
Fellows of Homerton College, Cambridge